Bad to the Bone is an album by the Jamaican reggae band Inner Circle.  Two versions of the album (U.S. and international) were released in 1992, and a U.S. re-issue titled Bad Boys was released in 1993.  The U.S. re-issue won the Grammy Award for Best Reggae Album.  Bad to the Bone (international version) and Bad Boys contain the singles "Sweat (A La La La La Long)", "Rock with You", and "Bad Boys".

Track listing 
The tracks "Make U Sweat", "Shock Out (Hawaiian Style)" and "Bone Mix Ragga Style" (a ragga remix of "Bad to the Bone") appear exclusively on the U.S. version of Bad to the Bone. The international version contains Bad Boys and the radio mix of "Make U Sweat", titled "Sweat (A La La La La Long)".

The track "Stuck in the Middle" appears exclusively on the international version of Bad to the Bone. The international version also contains different versions of "Rock With You" and "Wrapped Up in Your Love" than those that appear on Bad Boys.

Bad Boys 

Bad Boys consists entirely of songs from the international version of Bad to the Bone, but it is the first U.S. release to contain the songs "Sweat (A La La La La Long)", "Rock with You", "Wrapped Up in Your Love", "Living It Up", and "Hey Love". It is also the only of the three versions to contain the tracks "Sweat (A La La La La Long) (Dancehall Mix)" and "Bad Boys (David Morales Mix)". Bad Boys contains remixed versions of "Rock with You", "Wrapped Up in Your Love", and "Bad to the Bone" that do not appear either version of Bad to the Bone.

Track listing

References 

1992 albums
Inner Circle (band) albums
Warner Music Group albums